Viola elatior is a species of flowering plant belonging to the family Violaceae.

Its native range is Europe to China and Himalaya.

References

elatior